Carlo Conti (1556–1615) was a Roman Catholic cardinal.

Biography
On 21 July 1585, he was consecrated bishop by Giovanni Battista Castagna, Cardinal-Priest of San Marcello al Corso, with Filippo Sega, Bishop of Piacenza, and Vincenzo Casali, Bishop of Massa Marittima, serving as co-consecrators.

Episcopal succession
While bishop, he was the principal consecrator of:

and the principal co-consecrator of:

References

1556 births
1615 deaths
17th-century Italian cardinals
17th-century Italian Roman Catholic bishops